Charles Schuchert (July 3, 1858 – November 20, 1942) was an American invertebrate paleontologist who was a leader in the development of paleogeography, the study of the distribution of lands and seas in the geological past.

Biography
He was born in Cincinnati, Ohio, on July 3, 1858 to Philip and Agatha (Mueller) Schuchert. He received a common school education up to the age of thirteen, and then he spent a number of years working in his father's furniture business. Schuchert possessed an aptitude for scientific investigation, and in 1878 he began to attend meetings of the Cincinnati Society of Natural History. Here he developed a friendship with fellow Cincinnati native Edward Oscar Ulrich. The two collected and studied fossils from the Cincinnati area for ten years. In 1888, Schuchert moved to Albany, New York to apprentice under James Hall. He was preparator of fossils with Charles E. Beecher at Yale University from 1892 to 1893. He served on the United States Geological Survey from 1893 to 1894. After serving as curator of the U.S. National Museum from 1894 to 1904, Schuchert joined the Yale faculty, succeeding Beecher, the first invertebrate paleontologist there. He served as the director of the Peabody Museum of Natural History at Yale University from 1904 to 1923. He was the first president of the Paleontological Society in 1910. He served as president of The Geological Society of America in 1922.

Throughout his life, Schuchert amassed one of the largest brachiopod collections in the world. It is housed at the Peabody Museum. This collection has many notable specimens including a number of type specimens from his expansive work with G. Arthur Cooper, "Brachiopod genera of the suborders Orthoidea and Pentameroidea." There are also numerous specimens from the Salt Range and Anticosti Island.

Schuchert coined the term paleobiology in 1904. In 1934 Schuchert was awarded the Mary Clark Thompson Medal from the National Academy of Sciences.

Schuchert died in New Haven, Connecticut, on November 20, 1942.

Works 
 
 
 
 Textbook of Geology (1924)
 Historical Geology of North America (Three volumes – 1935–1943)

Notes

References 
 Adolph Knopf: Charles Schuchert 1858—1942. Biographical Memoir 1952, National Academy of Sciences
 History and Archives: Charles Schuchert. Peabody Museum of Natural History, Yale University
 "Charles Schuchert." American National Biography Online
 Charles Schuchert, American paleontologist. Encyclopædia Britannica online

External links 

 Charles Schuchert papers (MS 435). Manuscripts and Archives, Yale University Library. 

1858 births
1942 deaths
Penrose Medal winners
American paleontologists
American paleogeographers
Paleobiologists
Presidents of the Geological Society of America
Yale University alumni